Air station may refer to: 

 AirStation, a series of wireless LAN equipment sold by Buffalo Technology
 Airbase
 Naval air station
 A station to refill an air car